Ender Konca (born 22 October 1947) is a former footballer who played for Kasımpaşa, İstanbulspor, Eskişehirspor, Eintracht Frankfurt, Fenerbahçe and Turkey.

References

External links
 
 
 

1947 births
Living people
Turkish footballers
Turkey international footballers
Turkey under-21 international footballers
Turkey youth international footballers
Eintracht Frankfurt players
Expatriate footballers in Germany
Bundesliga players
Kasımpaşa S.K. footballers
Eskişehirspor footballers
Fenerbahçe S.K. footballers
Eskişehirspor managers
Sarıyer S.K. managers
Association football midfielders
Association football forwards
Turkish football managers